Natarsha Belling (born 29 May 1970) is an Australian journalist.

Belling has previously worked at Network 10 as a television presenter, news presenter and reporter. She spent over two decades with the company until being made redundant in August 2020.

Early life and education
Belling was born and raised in Mudgee in the Orana region of New South Wales. She often visits the town with her family and has philanthropic connections with the region.

She was a boarder at St Vincent's College, Potts Point in Sydney.

Belling attended Charles Sturt University in Bathurst, New South Wales and graduated with a Bachelor of Arts (Communications) degree.

Career
Prior to joining Network 10, Belling was a reporter with Prime Television in Orange, New South Wales, and was a presenter with the Australian Broadcasting Corporation in Darwin. She then joined 10, originally as a medical reporter.

Network 10 
In 2007, Belling became the national presenter of 10 Morning News, replacing Tracey Spicer. She read the news on Wednesdays to Fridays (with Ron Wilson presenting on Mondays and Tuesdays). From May 2009 through to 2012, Belling presented the bulletin from Monday to Wednesday. Belling was also a fill-in co-host for Kim Watkins on Ten's former morning show 9am with David and Kim.

Also in May 2009, Belling replaced Bill Woods on 10 Weekend News, upon returning from maternity leave.

In October 2011, Matt Doran joined Belling on a revamped version of 10 News Weekend, along with former Sports Tonight weekend presenter Rob Canning and meteorologist Magdalena Roze.

In late 2012, 10 Weekend News was returned to a solo presented bulletin with Belling in the role. Canning also resigned from the network after 12 years and Roze also eventually resigned.

In mid-2013 Hermione Kitson replaced Belling on 10 Weekend News, as Belling was promoted to co-present the new Wake Up breakfast program.

In mid-2014, Wake Up was axed and Belling took leave and wasn't given a permanent position again for some time, filling-in and having various guest roles. Belling returned to 10 Weekend News in 2015. Her final 10 Weekend News bulletin was on 16 December 2018.

In 2010, Belling presented brief news updates on The Circle, headlining the latest news on Wednesdays, Thursdays and Fridays.

In July 2012, Belling was appointed Thursday and Friday news presenter on Breakfast which, due to poor ratings, was cancelled in December 2012.

In July 2013, Belling was appointed co-host of Network 10's new breakfast show Wake Up with Natasha Exelby and James Mathison. Within a short time the program lost about 50% of its audience share by November 2013 rated lower than Breakfast, the show Ten cancelled the year before because of low ratings.

Belling was a regular fill in for Sarah Harris on Studio 10 and Carrie Bickmore on The Project. She also had a short stint hosting The Sunday Project until she was replaced by Chris Bath.

Belling's major Studio 10 fill-in stints were when host Sarah Harris took leave to marry her fiancé, host a local edition of Shark Tank Australia and when she was on maternity leave giving birth to her sons in 2015 and 2017.

In December 2018, it was announced that Belling would join Studio 10 as a news presenter. She has been working in this role from the beginning of 2019 and when Sarah Harris is not in attendance, Belling hosts the show for the day. Other panel members include Joe Hildebrand, Kerri-Anne Kennerly, Angela Bishop, and Denise Drysdale.

In August 2020, Belling was made redundant by Network 10, bringing to an end a career of over two decades with the network. Along with her, other Ten News presenters including Tim Bailey, Rebecca Morse and Kerri-Anne Kennerley were also made redundant.

Southern Cross Austereo 
On 17 November 2020, Belling announced that she would be fronting a new podcast, Your Morning Agenda. The podcast fall under Southern Cross Austereo's news podcast product suite and its commitment to deliver the most up to date news and current affairs for listeners. This daily news podcast will deliver the top breaking news stories every morning covering national and international, news and sport with a clear focus on business and finance from 6:30am.

As a passionate advocate for rural Australia, Belling announced her new role as the co-host and newsreader on Australia Today, through the Listnr app with Steve Price. The broadcast began on 6 April 2021, with episodes streaming on weekdays between 7 – 10am.

In November 2022, it was announced that Belling would join Mick Molloy and Mark Geyer as a newsreader on Molloy and MG in the Morning on Triple M Sydney.

Seven Network 
Four months after being made redundant by Network 10, Belling joined the Seven Network as a panelist and appears weekly on The Morning Show as a panelist to discuss current topics of interest, in the 'What's The Buzz' segment.

Natarsha has also filled in on The Morning Show, Seven's Early News, Sunrise and Weekend Sunrise.

Personal life
Belling is married to Glen Sealey who is currently working as the general manager for Renault Australia. They have two sons, Harry (b. 2007) and Hugo (b. 2009)

References

External links

 
Profile at Network Ten

1970 births
Living people
10 News First presenters
Australian television journalists
Charles Sturt University alumni
People from Mudgee